Frankel is a surname. Notable people with the surname include:

 Benjamin Frankel (1906–1973), British composer
 Bethenny Frankel (born 1970), American chef and reality television personality
 Charles Frankel (1917–1975), American philosopher, known for Charles Frankel Prize
 Cyril Frankel (1921–2017), British director
 Dan Frankel (American politician) (born 1956), member of the Pennsylvania House of Representatives
 Dan Frankel (British politician) (1900–1988), MP for Mile End, 1935–1945
 Dave Frankel, American attorney, former television weatherman and news anchor
 David Frankel (born 1959), American director, editor, screenwriter, executive producer
 Felice Frankel, American photographer of scientific art images, or artistic science images.
 Gene Frankel (1919–2005), American theater director
 Jacob Frankel (1808–1887), German-born American rabbi
 Jeffrey Frankel (born 1952), American economist
 Jerry Frankel (1930–2018), American musical theatre producer and thoroughbred breeder and owner
 Jonah Frankel (1928–2012), author, Hebrew literature professor and Israel Prize laureate
 Jonah Frankel (businessman) (died 1846), German Jewish businessman, banker and philanthropist
 Jonah Teomim-Frankel (1595–1669), author of the book Kikayon deYona
 Joseph Frankel (musician) (1882–1956), American army band and klezmer bandleader
 Justin Frankel (born 1978), American computer programmer
 Lee K. Frankel (1867–1931), American social worker and insurance executive
 Leó Frankel (1844–1896), Hungarian politician
 Lois Frankel (born 1948), member of the United States House of Representatives from Florida
 Martin Frankel (born 1954), American financier
 Max Frankel (born 1930), American journalist and former New York Times executive editor
 Naomi Frankel (1918–2009), German-Israeli novelist
 Otto Frankel (Otto Herzberg Frankel; 1900–1998), Australian biologist and geneticist of Austrian descent
 Richard B. Frankel, American physicist
 Robert "Bobby" J. Frankel (1941–2009), American thoroughbred race horse trainer
 Sandra Frankel (born 1941), former supervisor of the Town of Brighton, Monroe County, New York
 Susannah Frankel, British fashion journalist and author
 Susy Frankel, New Zealand law academic
 Stan Frankel (1919–1978), American physicist
 Theodore Frankel (1929–2017), American mathematician
 Tomer Frankel (born 2000), Israeli swimmer, European 2018 junior champion in the 100 m freestyle
 William Frankel (1903–2008), editor of the British weekly newspaper, The Jewish Chronicle, from 1958 to 1977
 Zecharias Frankel (1801–1875), Bohemian-German conservative rabbi, historian

See also
 Fränkel/Fraenkel
 Frenkel
 Frankl

Jewish surnames